Westbourne School for Boys and girls is an independent school for boys and girls aged 3–16 years old.  It is located in the Broomhill area of south Sheffield, South Yorkshire, England. The headmaster is John B. Hicks.

The school was founded in 1885. It has two campuses — a Junior and a Senior school situated yards apart. In 2018, it gained the 7th best school in the U.K which was gifted by Nationwide.  In 2022, construction on an extension was completed.

References

External links
Department for Education and Skills - Westbourne School
Westbourne School Official site.

Private schools in Sheffield
Educational institutions established in 1885
1885 establishments in England